Dream of the Elders is a studio album by the British jazz bassist Dave Holland and his quartet, featuring saxophonist Eric Person, vibraphonist Steve Nelson and drummer Gene Jackson.

Background
Like Holland's previous two ECM (record label) releases, Triplicate and Extensions, this album was recorded following the dissolving of his first band (Steve Coleman, Robin Eubanks, Kenny Wheeler, and Marvin "Smitty" Smith). Dream of the Elders has influenced Holland's future releases in several ways. It was his first release to feature vibraphonist Steve Nelson, who then went on to join Holland's second quintet, formed following the Dream of the Elders session. Additionally, four of the tunes introduced on the album ("Lazy Snake", "Claressence", "Equality" and "Ebb & Flow") have been revisited by Holland on future releases, albeit in re-arranged versions.

Reception
Bill Kahlklaase, of The New Mexican, stated: "1995’s magnificent Dream of the Elders, proved the bassist adept at bringing together superlative instrumentalists to play music that ranged between tightly arranged passages and bursts of improvisational freedom."

Track listing
All tunes written by Dave Holland.
 "The Winding Way" - 11:57
 "Lazy Snake" - 12:28
 "Claressence" - 7:29
 "Equality" - 7:12
 "Ebb & Flow" - 12:02
 "Dream of the Elders" - 11:10
 "Second Thoughts" - 8:06
 "Equality (instrumental)" - 6:40

Personnel
Eric Person - alto saxophone, soprano saxophone
Steve Nelson - vibraphone
Dave Holland - double bass
Gene Jackson - drums
Cassandra Wilson - vocals ("Equality" only)

References

External links

Dave Holland albums
1995 albums